Bertram John Goode (11 August 1886 - 30 April 1955) was an English footballer who played inside right.

Goode was born in Chester, England. He was 5 ft 7 1/2 in. tall and weighed 11 stones.

Career
During his career, Goode played for Hoole, Saltney, Chester, Liverpool (from 7 July 1908), and Wrexham (from 22 June 1910), before transferring to Aston Villa for £250 in April 1911. He transferred to Hull City for £300 on 2 May 1912 and also played for Chester, Wrexham and, as a wartime guest, Millwall and Southampton.

He died in Wrexham, Wales

References

External links
 LFC History profile

1886 births
1955 deaths
English footballers
Association football inside forwards
Liverpool F.C. players
Chester City F.C. players
Wrexham A.F.C. players
Aston Villa F.C. players
Hull City A.F.C. players
Southampton F.C. wartime guest players